Narayanapuram is a village in Bonakal Mandal, located in Khammam district of Telangana, India.

References

Villages in Khammam district